Sternotomis fairmairei is a species of beetle in the family Cerambycidae. It was described by Argod in 1899. It is known from Somalia.

References

Sternotomini
Beetles described in 1899